Ludwig Hollonius (c. 1570 – 1621) was a German playwright.

Pastor
As a Lutheran pastor in Pölitz (Police), Pomerania, he carefully refined his plays so that they met with the approval of his benefactor, Henry Julius, Duke of Brunswick-Lüneburg, who was responsible for building up Wolfenbüttel so much that it was the most heavily reinforced fortress in the Thirty Years' War.

Chief Work
Hollonius is chiefly remembered for his Latin opus, a comic farce, Somnium Vitae Humanae - (Latin for "Dream of a Human Life") - wherein an ordinary man, upon being made king for a day, is showered with all the flattering praise a king must confront daily, and yet also must deal with the concerns of his office, to which, in the form of advice to the circle of sycophantic hangers on around him, he attempts to frame in the form of rhetorical questions, answered by common-sense answers.

1570s births
1621 deaths
People from Police, West Pomeranian Voivodeship
17th-century German Lutheran clergy
People from the Duchy of Pomerania
German male dramatists and playwrights
17th-century German dramatists and playwrights
17th-century German male writers